Partners of the Tide is a 1921 American silent drama film directed by L.V. Jefferson and starring Jack Perrin, Daisy Jefferson and Gertrude Norman. It was distributed by the independent Hodkinson Pictures. It was based on the 1905 novel Partners of the Tide by Joseph C. Lincoln.

Cast
 Jack Perrin as Bradley Nickerson
 Marion Feducha as 	Bradley as a Boy 
 Gordon Mullen as Sam Hammond
 Daisy Jefferson as 	Augusta Baker 
 Gertrude Norman as 	Grandma Baker
 J.P. Lockney as 	Captain Ezra Titcomb
 Joe Miller as 	Carl Swenson
 Bert Hadley as 	James Williams
 Fred Kohler as 	First Mate
 Florence Midgley as Temperance Allen
 Ashley Cooper as Seth Rogers

References

Bibliography
 Munden, Kenneth White. The American Film Institute Catalog of Motion Pictures Produced in the United States, Part 1. University of California Press, 1997.

External links
 

1920s American films
1921 films
1921 drama  films
1920s English-language films
American silent feature films
Silent American drama films
American black-and-white films
Films distributed by W. W. Hodkinson Corporation
Films based on American novels